Francisco Dias Alves (20 January 1936 – 24 February 2022) was a Brazilian politician.

A member of the Brazilian Democratic Movement, he served in the Chamber of Deputies from 1982 to 1988. He died in Guarulhos on 24 February 2022, at the age of 86.

References

1936 births
2022 deaths
20th-century Brazilian politicians
Brazilian Democratic Movement politicians
People from Ceará
Members of the Chamber of Deputies (Brazil) from Ceará
Members of the Legislative Assembly of São Paulo